Esterhazya is a genus of flowering plants belonging to the family Orobanchaceae.

It is native to Bolivia, Brazil and Paraguay.

Its genus name of Esterhazya is in honour of Hungarian Nikolaus II, Prince Esterházy (1765–1833), and it was first published and described in Del. Fl. Faun. Bras. on table 5 in 1820.

Known species:
Esterhazya caesarea 
Esterhazya eitenorum 
Esterhazya macrodonta 
Esterhazya nanuzae 
Esterhazya splendida 
Esterhazya triflora

References

Orobanchaceae
Orobanchaceae genera
Plants described in 1820
Flora of Bolivia
Flora of Brazil
Flora of Paraguay